William Bruce may refer to:
 Sir William Bruce (architect) (c. 1630–1710), Scottish architect
 William Bruce, 8th Earl of Kincardine (died 1740), Scottish nobleman
 William Bruce (cricketer) (1864–1925), Australian cricketer
 William Bruce (Canadian politician) (died 1838), physician and politician in Upper Canada
 William Bruce (VC) (1890–1914), posthumous recipient of the Victoria Cross
 William Cabell Bruce (1860–1946), author and United States Senator
 Major William Bruce-Gardyne of Clan Gardyne, Laird of Middleton, Angus, Scotland
 William Speirs Bruce (1867–1921), Scottish explorer
 William George Bruce (1856–1949), Milwaukee publisher, historian, and civic leader
 William Bruce (minister) (1757–1841), Irish Presbyterian and educator
 William Blair Bruce (1859–1906), Canadian painter
 William Napier Bruce (1858–1936), British educationalist and lawyer
 William J. Bruce III, American author and publicist

See also
Bill Bruce (disambiguation)